The 93rd Infantry Brigade was a formation of the United States Army. It was part of the New York Army National Guard from 1926 to 1940. It controlled several separate infantry regiments of the New York National Guard in the interwar period between the First and Second World Wars.

The brigade was constituted in April 1926 and made part of the New York National Guard. Its headquarters was organized in New York City and federally recognized on 2 April 1928, and assigned to the First Army on 1 October 1933. It conducted annual summer training most years at Camp Smith, Peekskill New York, from 1927 to 1939. On 1 September 1940, the headquarters was reorganized and redesignated as Headquarters and Headquarters Battery, 71st Field Artillery Brigade.

Organization 

HHC, 93rd Infantry Brigade (Separate)
HQ New York, New York 1926-1940

Subordinate Units 

10th Infantry Regiment (New York) 1927-1940
14th Infantry Regiment (New York) 1926-1940
71st Infantry Regiment 1926-1927
165th Infantry Regiment 1927-1940
369th Infantry Regiment (Colored) 1927-1940

Status 

Part of the NY ARNG, the inactive HQ II Corps Artillery carries the traditions of the 71st FA Brigade.

Commanders 

Brigadier General John J. Phelan January 26, 1927 – June 3, 1936
Brigadier General Charles G. Blakeslee June 3, 1936 – August 25, 1938
Brigadier General Alexander E. Anderson August 25, 1938 – July 17, 1940
Brigadier General Walter A. De Lamater July 17, 1940 – August 14, 1940
Brigadier General Joseph A. S. Mundy August 14, 1940 – September 1, 1940

Notes

Further reading 

093
Military units and formations established in 1926
Military units and formations disestablished in 1940